The following list notes recordings by soprano Edita Gruberová, notably in full-length operas. She also recorded extended selections from Donizetti's Tudor Queens' trilogy and other bel canto operas. More than a dozen of her filmed and televised opera appearances have been released on DVD.

Recordings with Gruberová include:

References 

Opera singer discographies